Each episode of the animated musical children's television series PB&J Otter was typically divided into two 11-minute stories. Some seasonal specials and the occasional double-length episode took up the entire program length and half hour length. Though episodes only lasted twenty-two minutes, interstitial content was presented at the end of airings before the next show. As the network Disney Junior remains free of commercial broadcasts, airings on this network follow this format as well.

Series overview

Episodes

Each episode consists of at least 1 or more songs (excepting "A Sledding We Will Go" and "Dare Duck"), and an interstitial of a "Noodle Dance" for each problem the characters solve. Peanut and Jelly are the only characters to be present in all episodes. These are the episodes listed below. 

Note: All episodes were directed by Jeff Buckland.

Season 1 (1998)

Season 2 (1999–2000)

Season 3 (2000)

References

Lists of American children's animated television series episodes
Lists of Disney Channel television series episodes